Chezala carella is a moth in the family Oecophoridae. It was described by Francis Walker in 1864. It is found in Australia, where it has been recorded from Queensland.

The wingspan is 16–24 mm for males and 25–30 mm for females. The forewings are ochreous-grey whitish. The hindwings are pale grey.

References

Moths described in 1864
Chezala